Peter Grubb may refer to:

Peter Grubb (mason) (1702–1754), American mason and founder of Grubb Family Iron Dynasty
Peter Grubb, Jr. (1740–1786), American patriot and member of Grubb Family Iron Dynasty
Peter J. Grubb (born 1935), English ecologist
Peter Grubb (zoologist) (1942–2006), English zoologist